The 2nd constituency of the Creuse was a French legislative constituency in the Creuse département. It was abolished in the 2010 redistricting of French legislative constituencies, its last deputy was Jean Auclair. From the 2012 election onwards, the entire department was one constituency.

Election results

2007

Sources
 Official results of French elections from 1998: 

Defunct French legislative constituencies
French legislative constituencies of Creuse